The Influencers is a festival that mixes art, guerrilla communication and radical entertainment. It is curated by Bani Brusadin, Eva & Franco Mattes. In 2012, one of the guests was the Russian art collective Voina.

References

External links 

Official site

Festivals in Spain
Culture in Barcelona
Recurring events established in 2004